There were 69 female and 182 male athletes representing the country at the 2000 Summer Paralympics. They won 95 medals (16 gold, 41 silver, 38 bronze).

Medal table

See also
Germany at the Paralympics
Germany at the 2000 Summer Olympics

References

Bibliography

External links
Full list of medallists on IPC site

Nations at the 2000 Summer Paralympics
Paralympics
2000